Raghavbhai Chondabhai Makwana (popularly known as R. C. Makwana) is an Indian politician, sitting MLA of Mahuva and State minister in Gujarat government during Bhupendrabhai Patel ministry. He took oath as State Minister for Social justice and empowerment department. Makwana belong to the Koli caste of Gujarat.

References 

1970 births
Living people